Tristira may refer to:
 Tristira (grasshopper), a genus of insects in the family Tristiridae
 Tristira (plant), a genus of flowering plants in the family Sapindaceae